The Stardust International Raceway was an auto racing track in present-day Spring Valley, Nevada, in the Las Vegas Valley.  It featured a flat, 13-turn road course, and a quarter-mile drag strip.  Some track maps depicted the road course with 10 numbered turns.

Stardust International Raceway was developed in 1965 by the Stardust Racing Association, a Nevada corporation headed by the primary owner of the Desert Inn and Stardust hotel-casinos.  The track was developed ostensibly to attract high rollers to the Stardust hotel.  The Stardust Racing Association also owned the property and functioned as event promoter.

In 1966 it began hosting the season finale of the Can-Am championship.  In 1968 the USAC Championship Car series held a race at Stardust.  The drag strip hosted the NHRA Stardust National Open in 1967, 1968, 1969, and 1971.

The Stardust Racing Association was dissolved on April 1, 1968, 1 day after the USAC Stardust 150.  The hotel and raceway were sold in January 1969 to the Parvin-Dohrmann Corporation, and the new ownership closed the track shortly thereafter.  Larry Horton, the track's manager, re-opened the drag strip in August 1970 and ran drag racing events until October 1971.  Real estate developers Pardee Homes acquired the Stardust International Raceway property and related adjacent properties in August 1970 and built the Spring Valley community.  Pardee commenced residential development on a portion of the property as drag racing events were still in operation directly adjacent.  The track was replaced by the Las Vegas Speedrome, which opened in 1972 as a drag strip and road course.  It was subsequently expanded in 1985 with a 3/8 mile paved oval, in 1996 with a 1.5 mile oval, when the circuits current name, Las Vegas Motor Speedway, was used, and in 2000 with the current drag strip location.

Results

Sports car

Trans-Am

USAC Champ Car

Lap records 
The official lap records at Stardust International Raceway are listed as:

References

External links
Ultimate Racing History: Stardust archive
Track info and map

Motorsport venues in Nevada
Defunct motorsport venues in the United States
Motorsport in Las Vegas
Defunct sports venues in Nevada
1965 establishments in Nevada
1970 disestablishments in Nevada
Sports venues completed in 1965